Fearless is the debut extended play by South Korean girl group Le Sserafim. It was released by Source Music on May 2, 2022, and contains five tracks, including the lead single of the same name. Fearless is the group's only release to include Kim Ga-ram, who was removed from the lineup on July 20, 2022.

Background and release
On March 14, 2022, Source Music announced it would be debuting a new girl group in collaboration with Hybe Corporation. One week later, Hybe Corporation announced the group would be debuting in May. On April 13, it was announced the group would release their debut extended play Fearless on May 2. On April 25, the track list was released, with "Fearless" announced as the lead single. Two days later, the highlight medley video was released. Music video teasers for the lead single were released on April 29 and May 1, respectively.

Composition
Fearless consists of five tracks and incorporates various genres of alternative pop, disco-funk, and R&B. The opening track, "The World is My Oyster", is characterized by "a strong rhythm and a psychedelic mood that [is] reminiscent of the runway of a fashion show". The lead single "Fearless" is a funk and alternative pop song with lyrics about "moving forward without being shaken by the past". The third track "Blue Flame" is a disco-punk song with "a sophisticated melody and mysterious atmosphere". The fourth track "The Great Mermaid" was described as a retelling of The Little Mermaid fairytale "from the perspective of Le Sserafim". The final track "Sour Grapes" was "inspired by Aesop's The Fox and the Grapes" fable and features lyrics detailing "[the] psychology of pure curiosity about love and the selfish side of valuing oneself more".

Commercial performance
On April 30, it was announced that pre-orders of Fearless exceeded 380,000 copies.

On the day of its release alone, the extended play (EP) sold more than 175,000 copies, breaking the record for a girl group debut set previously in January by Kep1er's First Impact, which achieved 150,000 first-day album sales.

Fearless debuted at number two on South Korea's Gaon Album Chart in the issue dated May 1–7, 2022; on the monthly chart, it debuted at number five in the issue for May 2022 with 412,696 copies sold. On Billboard Japan Hot Albums, the EP debuted at number one in the chart issue dated May 11, 2022. It also debuted at number three on the Oricon Albums Chart in the chart issue dated May 16, 2022; on the monthly chart, it debuted at number nine in the issue for May 2022 with 32,998 copies sold. The EP debuted at number 37 on the Hungarian MAHASZ Top 40 Album Chart in the issue dated May 20–26, 2022.

Promotion
Following the release of Fearless, Le Sserafim held a live showcase on the same date to introduce the extended play and communicate with their fans. The group performed "Fearless" and "Blue Flame" during the showcase.

Track listing

Notes
 All tracks are produced by 13.

Charts

Weekly charts

Monthly charts

Year-end charts

Sales and certifications

Release history

See also
 List of Billboard Japan Hot Albums number ones of 2022

References

2022 debut EPs
Korean-language EPs
Hybe Corporation EPs
Source Music EPs
Le Sserafim albums